For Those Who Are at Sea, is a 1947 Soviet drama film directed by Aleksandr Faintsimmer.

Plot 
The film tells the story of the sailors who fought on torpedo boats during the Great Patriotic War.

Starring 
 Mikhail Zharov as Kharitonov
 Aleksandra Trishko as Sofiya Petrovna
  as Maksimov
 Ninel Myshkova as Olga Shabunina
 Gennadi Karnovich-Valua as Borovsky
 Elvira Lutsenko as Actress Elena Gorelova (as E. Lutsenko)
 Daniil Sagal as Misha Rekalo
 Ivan Lyubeznov as Lishev
 Pavel Shpringfeld as Andrei Klobukov
 Georgiy Kurovskiy as Shubin
 Stepan Krylov as Gudkov
 Mikhail Dubrava as Opanasenko

References

External links 
 

1947 films
1940s Russian-language films
Soviet war drama films
1940s war drama films
Soviet black-and-white films
1947 drama films